Earle Wayne Hopping (October 31, 1882 - January 1963) was an American polo player. He played for the United States in the 1930 International Polo Cup. In that year the American side won the series 10-5 and 14-9. He also had an intercollegiate indoor polo cup named after him which was played by West Point  against the Yale University Bulldogs and which ended in a 9 1/2 to 3 victory for West Point.

Biography
He was born on October 31, 1882 in Lebanon, Ohio to Ellery Hopping. He died in January 1963.

References 

1882 births
1963 deaths
American polo players
International Polo Cup
Roehampton Trophy